The Sydney River McDonald's murders occurred on May 7, 1992, at the McDonald's restaurant in Sydney River, Nova Scotia, Canada. They were committed by a trio of friends who robbed the restaurant, murdering three people and permanently disabling a fourth in the process. It was one of the highest-profile murder cases in Canada at the time.

Robbery and murders
Derek Wood, 18, an employee of the restaurant along with two friends, Freeman Daniel MacNeil, 23, and Darren Muise, 18, broke into the restaurant after closing, planning to rob the establishment. They murdered their victims with a .22 calibre pistol, several knives, and a shovel. One victim survived after being shot in the face, but was left permanently disabled. Forcing an employee to open the restaurant's safe, they made off with $2,017.

Victims
Killed:
Jimmy Fagan, 27
Donna Warren, 22
Neil Burroughs Jr., 29

Injured:
Arlene MacNeil, 20 (permanently disabled, died 2018)

Community response
The murders put Sydney into the spotlight as this became a news story worldwide. The restaurant was in the shopping district of Sydney River on Kings Road. It reopened two weeks later, with restaurant sales reaching former levels within a year. The building was demolished in 2000 and moved down the road to a more accessible location. The site of the former McDonald's is currently an empty lot.

Trial and sentence
MacNeil and Wood were sentenced to life imprisonment with 25 years before parole eligibility. Muise received 20 years before parole eligibility.

Parole dispositions
On March 29, 2011, the National Parole Board announced their decision to grant Muise day parole. A member stated: "Given the significant and real progress you have made over the years, your case management team is of the opinion that the probability that you commit a crime after your release is low." He received full parole on November 22, 2012.

On December 29, 2022, McNeil was granted day parole. The National Parole Board had rejected an application for parole by Wood earlier that year, claiming he was "too high a risk to reoffend".

See also
San Ysidro McDonald's massacre

References

Mass murder in 1992
History of Nova Scotia
History of the Cape Breton Regional Municipality
Murder in Nova Scotia
Crime in Nova Scotia

Attacks on restaurants in North America
1992 in Nova Scotia
May 1992 events in Canada
History of McDonald's
1992 murders in Canada